We Fight to Be Free is a 2006 short biographical film about George Washington directed by Kees Van Oostrum and starring Sebastian Roché, Caroline Goodall, Stephen Lang and Peter Woodward.

Synopsis
The film features the story of American Revolutionary war hero and first United States president, George Washington, including his military achievements and pivotal moments in his life.

Cast
Sebastian Roché as George Washington
Caroline Goodall as Martha Dandridge Custis
Stephen Lang as James Craik
Peter Woodward as Edward Braddock

Reception 
The film has received generally positive reviews. Desson Thomson wrote for The Washington Post, "'We Fight to Be Free' is the real headliner: a rousing 18-minute action film about Washington's life that greets visitors to the new Ford Orientation Center". Denise D. Meringolo was critical of the film, writing for The Public Historian:"We Fight to Be Free" is oddly incomplete—it fails to explain fully Washington’s attachment to the estate or to portray the complexity of his choices as a military officer and a political figure.

See also
 George Washington (1984 miniseries)
 George Washington II: The Forging of a Nation (1986 miniseries)
 Washington, 2020 miniseries
 List of television series and miniseries about the American Revolution
 List of films about the American Revolution

References

External links
 

2006 films
2006 biographical drama films
2006 short films
2000s American films
2000s English-language films
2000s historical drama films
American biographical drama films
American drama short films
American films based on actual events
American historical drama films
American Revolutionary War films
Films about George Washington
Cultural depictions of George Washington
Drama films based on actual events
Films about presidents of the United States
Films shot in Virginia
War films based on actual events
Cultural depictions of Martha Washington